Anderson Valley Unified School District, a public school district based in Boonville, Mendocino County, California, provides compulsory public primary and secondary education in the entirety of the nearly 20 mile long Anderson Valley, from the Mendocino County line north of Cloverdale to White Gulch, six miles north of Navarro. The district has 2,863 residents and averages a total enrollment of over 400 students.

The district operates five schools, all of which are located (along with the district office) in Boonville.

History 
The first record of a school operating in the valley dates back to 1858, when parents in the community erected a one room log cabin on the site of the current California Department of Transportation maintenance station in Boonville (at PM 28.0 on State Highway 128) and collectively raised the sum of $150 to pay a teacher to operate it for three months.

Demographics 
The student population is 75% Hispanic, 23% White and 2% Other, with all students provided the opportunity to graduate biliterate and bilingual in English and Spanish.

Schools

References

External links 
 

School districts in Mendocino County, California